Stretch Armstrong and the Flex Fighters is an American animated series produced by Hasbro Studios and distributed by Netflix. It is based on the 1970s action figure Stretch Armstrong. The Netflix series features a brand new superhero universe, new characters, new villains, and new lore. The series was developed by executive producers Kevin Burke, Victor Cook, and Chris "Doc" Wyatt.

Victor Cook also oversaw the series as supervising director, Burke and Wyatt as story editors.

Burke and Wyatt also wrote a tie-in comic book for IDW Publishing. The first season was released on Netflix on November 17, 2017. The second season was released on September 7, 2018.

Plot
Jake Armstrong, Nathan Park, and Ricardo Perez were three ordinary teenagers living in the technological hub Charter City until they were doused in a substance known as "Flexarium" during an accident. Their newfound superpowers garnered the attention of Jonathan Rook, the CEO of Rook Unlimited and benefactor to Charter City himself. Rook offers them their freedom from the authorities over the accident in exchange for enlisting the trio as Charter City's superhero team known as the Flex Fighters. Agreeing on the terms that Rook and everyone else won't know their real identities, Jake becomes Stretch, Nathan becomes Wingspan, and Ricardo becomes Omni-Mass.

In their first days as superheroes, the Flex Fighters receive hard training from Malcolm Kane (Rook's second-in-command) while fighting against numerous villains including Stretch Monster, who benefices many of them, and also shared a past with Dr. Racine Cleo / Dr. C (Rook's former mentor) and her ninja companion Riya Dashti / Blindstrike (Stretch's classmate and love interest).

In their last mission, the Flex Fighters discover in horror that Jonathan Rook and Stretch Monster are the same person and therefore, he has been their enemy the whole time. Rook intends to use Dr. C's "HyperFlexarium" formula to create an army of monsters and conquer the world. With the help of Dr. C and Blindstrike, the Flex Fighters escaped from Rook, but he then frames them in public for the rampage he caused over the city.

With the city under Rook's control and its citizens being turned against them, the Flex Fighters decided to join forces with Dr. C and Blindstrike in order to expose Rook's crimes and clear their names.

In season two, now that Rook has fooled all of Charter City into thinking the Flex Fighters are now bad guys, the Flex Fighters work with Dr. C and Blindstrike to fight Rook's mercenaries while working to clear their name. They must also deal with Malcolm Kane when the Tech Men attack.

Characters

Heroes
 Stretch / Jake Armstrong (voiced by Scott Menville) – Jake Armstrong is an over-scheduled high school student who is exposed to experimental chemicals that gives him super-stretching abilities.
 Wingspan / Nathan Park (voiced by Steven Yeun) – Nathan Park is a high school student with a large family and is Jake's best friend who is also exposed to the same experimental chemicals, and gains the ability to flatten his body from the neck down to gain gliding suit-like wings.
 Omni-Mass / Ricardo Perez (voiced by Ogie Banks) – Ricardo Perez is the new, hotshot kid at Jake and Nathan's high school whom they befriend. Like Jake and Nathan, Ricardo is also exposed to the same experimental chemicals, and gains the ability to change his size and mass.
 Dr. C / Racine Cleo (voiced by Kate Mulgrew) – Dr. Racine Cleo is a scientist who mentored Jonathan Rook. She faked her disappearance in hopes to stop her former protégé from taking over the world.
 Blindstrike / Riya Dashti (voiced by Nazneen Contractor as a teenager, Kathreen Khavari as a child) – Riya Dashti is an Indian-American student and classmate of the Flex Fighters who is secretly a Ninja warrior working with Dr. C. She later reveals her parents worked on the Flexarium formulas before Stretch Monster killed them by sabotaging their plane to crash on the Pearl Islands.
 Erika Violette (voiced by Felicia Day) – A classmate of the Flex Fighters and Nathan's love interest. She becomes the team's ally after Nathan tells her the truth in "Dr. Dreamscape" and she follows them in "Riya's Revenge." She later gets energy powers and a purple energy form capable of flight in the season 2 finale.

Villains
 Stretch Monster / Jonathan Rook (voiced by Wil Wheaton in human form, Miguel Ferrer in monster form in 2017, David Kaye in monster form in 2018) – Jonathan Rook is the CEO of Rook Unlimited and the benefactor behind the Flex Fighters. Unbeknownst to them until the season 1 finale, Rook is secretly Stretch Monster, an elastic creature who is also a benefactor to the criminal kind. Near the end of season 2, Stretch Monster had to work with the Flex Fighters to fight a common foe in the Tech Men.
 Tech Men - Formerly known as the Epsilon Society, they are an evil organization. At an earlier life, Jonathan Rook wanted to join the Epsilon Society only to change his mind when he didn't want to sacrifice his family and his identity. After the Epsilon Society was disbanded, some of its members came back together as the Tech Men where their cult-like aura had them believing that they are the true handlers of technology.
 Number One / Malcolm Kane (voiced by Keith David) – Malcolm Kane is the head of security for Rook Unlimited and the former mentor to the Flex Fighters. It is revealed that he is the leader of the Tech Men who was aware of Rook's double life.
 Number Six (voiced by Luke Arnold) – Vice Commander of the Tech Men. 
 Number Twenty-Four (voiced by Ian Hopps)  - A member of the Tech Men who ends up in the hospital in season 1, but is revived in season 2 "Rise of the Tech-Men" by Number Six. Prior to falling comatose, he informs Stretch that he is the only one that can save the city.
 Multi-Farious / Donald "Don" Robertson (voiced by Jon Heder) – Dr. Don Robertson is a former employee of Rook Unlimited that became mutated into a granite monster that can multiply at will. He gets cured of his mutation in the interactive special and its canon two-part episode version "The Breakout" by a serum Rook made in the warehouse where Don and the Flex Fighters first got their powers. In the interactive version, his other fates would have him either killed by acid or getting stuck in cement.
 Circuit-Stream (voiced by James Arnold Taylor) – An expert hacker who can phase through walls and control any electronic equipment.
 Brute - Circuit-Stream's pet gecko.
 The Freak Sisters / Kari and Mari Freak (both voiced by Grey Griffin) – Kari and Mari Freak are a pair of twin sister criminals who wear helmets that give them Flexarium tentacles. They also use Flexarium-based weapons to commit crimes.
 Smokestack / Jack Kinland (voiced by Clancy Brown) – Jack Kinland is the former lead crime boss in Old Town who ran the Made Men and was serving a life sentence. He becomes a smoke-induced criminal who gained his Flexarium from Stretch Monster. As Smokestack, he can solidify and transform into a cloud of smoke.
 Mickey Simmons (voiced by Henry Rollins) – Kane's former gang partner and the leader of the Stick Shifts. He holds a grudge on him due to leaving and joining with Rook Unlimited.
 Madam Tousant (voiced by Vanessa Marshall) – A gang boss who leads a team of older, yet very powerful women called the Sables.
 Quick Charge / Sarah Kamen (voiced by Yvette Nicole Brown) – Dr. Sarah Kamen is the former head of Harkness General energy company. She gains electricity powers that she can skate on and tries to put Rook out of business.
 Mechanica / Santos (voiced by Tia Carrere) – Officer Santos is a member of Rook's security team who was a victim in the fight in Rook Tower between the Flex Fighters and Stretch Monster. She is converted into a vengeful, deadly cyborg by Rook.
 Dr. Dreamscape / Jason "Jay" Michaels (voiced by Michael Ross) – Jay Michaels is a spiritual master with enhanced telepathic abilities that allow him to hypnotize others by trapping them in a sleep state and manipulating their dreams.
 The Gentleman (voiced by Eric Bauza) – A mysterious mercenary with good manners. He wears a robotic suit that enhances his strength and agility.
 Anastasia (voiced by Tara Strong) – A hybrid between a flower and an artificial intelligence who was created by her creator and "father" Oleg Savic.

Supporting
 Mark Armstrong (voiced by Gary Cole) – Jake's father.
 Sandy Violette (voiced by Kath Soucie) - Erika's mother.
 Gabe-Farious / Gabe Bannerman (voiced by Josh Keaton) – Gabe Bannerman is a narcissistic classmate of the Flex Fighters who briefly dated Erika and becomes jealous of Nathan when he begins to date her. In the second season, he is briefly transformed into the new Multi-Farious until Wingspan finds a piece of his true personality and cures him.
 Miya Kimanyan (voiced by Kelly Hu) – A local news reporter based in Charter City.
 Kyle "King Jock" (voiced by Josh Keaton) – Kyle is a classmate of the Flex Fighters and somewhat of a bully.
 Grace Lidstrom (voiced by Kelly Hu) – An employee of Rook's who manages the Flex Fighter's online presence.
 Grandpa Park (voiced by Sab Shimono) – Nathan's wise grandfather who came to learn about his grandson's secret. Grandpa Park used to be a working reporter.
 Isabelle Park (voiced by Stephanie Sheh) – Nathan's younger sister.
 Officer Reynolds (voiced by Will Friedle) – Kane's sarcastic second-in-command, who leads a special ops team under Rook's employ. He is later promoted to head of security of Rook Unlimited at the end of the second season only to be replaced by Rook's Hyper-Flexarium test subject and confidant.
 Biomass / Oleg Savic (voiced by Walter Koenig) – Oleg Savic is the Flex Fighters' botany teacher. In the second season, he was temporarily able to transform into a plant monster that was super strong and could control vines as weapons.
 Malouf (voiced by Eric Bauza) – A short-tempered classmate of the Flex Fighters.
 Brick and Mortar (voiced by Wayne Knight and Troy Baker respectively) – Two misunderstood scientists. Brick possesses gauntlets that send shock waves while Mortar possesses a gun that sprays a liquid that makes solid objects temporarily malleable. They are later hired by Rook Unlimited.

Production
Stretch Armstrong was originally released in 1976 by Kenner Products. In 1987, Kenner was acquired by Tonka, which was later acquired together in 1991 by Hasbro. All of rights to Kenner's products were transferred to Hasbro in 2000, when the latter shut down Kenner's office.

There have been several attempts to adapt the property into a television series or film, with the latter, as a live-action film, have failed attempts by Disney (in 1994), Universal (in 2008) and Relativity Media (in 2012). Originally announced and developed as a live-action series starring a teenage version of the 1970s superhero, the idea was eventually retooled as an animated series targeted to children before bringing in Cook as producer, based on his work with The Spectacular Spider-Man TV series. Shortly thereafter, Burke and Wyatt were hired to produce and write. The series was designed to have episodic stories that also serialize into a larger plot over the course of the first season's 26 episodes. The first footage from the series was shown at HasCon on September 10, 2017.

The series is animated by Digital eMation in South Korea.

Episodes

Season 1 (2017)

Season 2 (2018)

Special (2018)

Comic book

The first issue of Stretch Armstrong and the Flex Fighters was released on February 28, 2018. All three issues serve as one full episode that takes place before the season 1 episode "Lie Sandwich".

Reception

The series was received positively. Emily Ashby of Common Sense Media described the series as a "fan superhero tale" with cartoon violence in each episode, but emphasis on teamwork as a theme. She also called it an "evolving buddy comedy" between the main characters.

References

External links
 
Stretch Armstrong and the Flex Fighters at Hasbro Studios
 Announcement from Netflix
 

2017 American television series debuts
2018 American television series endings
2010s American animated television series
2010s American high school television series
American children's animated action television series
American children's animated adventure television series
American children's animated science fantasy television series
American children's animated superhero television series
Anime-influenced Western animated television series
Teen animated television series
Teen superhero television series
IDW Publishing titles
English-language Netflix original programming
Netflix children's programming
Television series by Hasbro Studios